Kostyantyn Yuriyovych Yaroshenko (born 12 September 1986) is a Ukrainian professional football midfielder who plays for Þróttur.

Career
Yaroshenko also played on the Ukraine national under-21 football team where he has scored two goals in the qualification for the under-21 championship in Sweden.

His father Yuriy Yaroshenko also played football.

External links
 

Profile on Official Illychivets Website 
Profile on Football Squads

1986 births
Living people
Footballers from Luhansk
Ukrainian footballers
Association football midfielders
Ukraine youth international footballers
Ukraine under-21 international footballers
FC Shakhtar-3 Donetsk players
FC Shakhtar-2 Donetsk players
FC Metalist Kharkiv players
FC Arsenal Kyiv players
FC Chornomorets Odesa players
FC Mariupol players
FC Vorskla Poltava players
FC Sevastopol players
FC Ural Yekaterinburg players
FC Karpaty Lviv players
Kokkolan Palloveikot players
FC Alians Lypova Dolyna players
Knattspyrnufélagið Þróttur players
Ukrainian Premier League players
Ukrainian First League players
Ukrainian Second League players
Russian Premier League players
Ukrainian expatriate footballers
Expatriate footballers in Russia
Ukrainian expatriate sportspeople in Russia
Expatriate footballers in Finland
Ukrainian expatriate sportspeople in Finland
Expatriate footballers in Iceland
Ukrainian expatriate sportspeople in Iceland